Douglas Boyd Eggers (born September 21, 1930) is a former American football linebacker who played five seasons in the National Football League with the Baltimore Colts and Chicago Cardinals. He played college football at South Dakota State University and attended Wagner High School in Wagner, South Dakota.

College career
Eggers lettered three straight years for the South Dakota State Jackrabbits. He was team captain and earned all-North Central Conference honors in 1951. He graduated in 1952. Eggers was inducted into the Jackrabbit Sports Hall of Fame in 1980.

Professional career
Eggers was drafted into the United States Army in November 1952. He played on the post football team for two seasons at Fort Belvoir in Virginia. The team's coach, Al Davis, later arranged tryouts for Eggers with the Philadelphia Eagles and Baltimore Colts. Upon his discharge from the army, Eggers signed with the Baltimore Colts in January 1954 and played in 46 games for the team from 1954 to 1957. Eggers played in eight games for the Chicago Cardinals during the 1958 season.

Personal life
Eggers graduated from Wagner High School in 1948. After his football career, Eggers owned the Chesapeake Supply and Equipment Company until retiring in 1978.

References

External links
Just Sports Stats

1930 births
Living people
20th-century American businesspeople
Players of American football from South Dakota
American football linebackers
South Dakota State Jackrabbits football players
Baltimore Colts players
Chicago Cardinals players
United States Army soldiers
Businesspeople from South Dakota
People from Wagner, South Dakota